The tenth season of the reality television series Love & Hip Hop: Atlanta aired on VH1 from  July 5, 2021 until November 21, 2022. The show was primarily filmed in Atlanta, Georgia. It is executive produced by Mona Scott-Young and Stephanie R. Gayle for Monami Productions and Lashan Browning, Donna Edge-Rachell, Paris Bauldwin, Daniel Wiener and Jamail Shelton for New Group Productions. Sitarah Pendelton and Phakiso Collins are executive producers for VH1.

The series chronicles the lives of several women and men in the Atlanta area, involved in hip hop music. It consists of 29 episodes, including a two-part reunion special hosted by Claudia Jordan.

Production
Filming for season ten of Love & Hip Hop: Atlanta began in February 2021.

On June 7, 2021, VH1 announced the show's return for a tenth season, which premiered on July 5, 2021. It saw the promotion of Kirk Frost, Erica Mena and Safaree to the main cast, and the addition of rappers Yung Baby Tate and Omeretta the Great, along with Love & Hip Hop: New Yorks Yandy Smith-Harris and Mendeecees Harris. Karlie Redd, Scrappy and Joc were demoted to supporting cast, along with new cast member Renni Rucci, Rasheeda and Kirk's son Ky Frost, Yandy's foster daughter Infinity and her mother-in-law Judy Harris, Karlie's daughter Jasmine, Joc's son Amoni, Sierra's boyfriend Eric and Spice's boyfriend Justin Budd. The season was preceded by the special Love & Hip Hop Atlanta: Inside the A.

On July 11, 2022, VH1 announced that additional episodes will air from August 8, 2022. Yung Baby Tate and Omeretta were removed from the opening credits, replaced by Joc and his fiancé Kendra Robinson, and Scrappy and Bambi. New cast members include Spice's friend Meda Montana and Mendeecees' son Lil Mendeecees, with Mimi Faust returning in a supporting role late into the season.

Synopsis

Cast

Part 1
Starring

 Rasheeda (11 episodes) 
 Kirk Frost (12 episodes) 
 Yung Baby Tate (7 episodes) 
 Sierra Gates (9 episodes) 
 Erica Mena (11 episodes) 
 Safaree Samuels (10 episodes) 
 Omeretta the Great (4 episodes) 
 Spice (5 episodes) 
 Yandy Smith Harris (11 episodes) 
 Mendeecees Harris (11 episodes) 
Also starring
 Bambi Benson (8 episodes) 
 Yung Joc (7 episodes)
 Lil Scrappy (7 episodes)
 BK Brasco (3 episodes)
 Karlie Redd (9 episodes)
 Kelsie Frost (3 episodes)
 Ky Frost (5 episodes)
 Infinity Gilyard (4 episodes)
 Shirleen Harvell (3 episodes)
 Renni Rucci (4 episodes)
 Jasmine Ellis (6 episodes)
 Momma Dee (5 episodes)
 Judy Harris (2 episodes)
 Erica Dixon (5 episodes)
 Eric Whitehead (4 episodes)
 Justin Budd (3 episodes)
 Amoni Robinson (4 episodes)

Part 2
Starring

 Rasheeda (12 episodes) 
 Kirk Frost (12 episodes) 
 Spice (15 episodes) 
 Erica Mena (12 episodes) 
 Safaree Samuels (12 episodes) 
 Sierra Gates (15 episodes)  
 Yandy Smith Harris (9 episodes)
 Mendeecees Harris (10 episodes) 
 Yung Joc (13 episodes)
 Kendra Robinson (13 episodes)
 Lil Scrappy (11 episodes)
 Bambi Benson (12 episodes)
Also starring
 Renni Rucci (9 episodes)
 Karlie Redd (13 episodes)
 Shekinah Anderson (13 episodes)
 Eric Whitehead (10 episodes)
 Rich Dollaz (6 episodes)
 Momma Dee (9 episodes)
 Meda Montana (12 episodes)
 Lil Mendeecees (5 episodes)
 Mimi Faust (2 episodes)

Lamar Odom, Guapdad 4000, Shaggy, Trick Daddy and Queen Naija appear in guest roles. Love & Hip Hop: Hollywoods Brittany B., Love & Hip Hop: Miami Trick Daddy and Love & Hip Hop: New Yorks Jonathan Fernandez and Cyn Santana make crossover appearances.

Episodes

Webisodes

Check Yourself
Love & Hip Hop Atlanta: Check Yourself, which features the cast's reactions to each episode, was released weekly with every episode on digital platforms.

Bonus scenes
Deleted scenes from the season's episodes were released weekly as bonus content on VH1's official website.

References

External links

2021 American television seasons
2022 American television seasons
Love & Hip Hop